St Mary on Paddington Green is an Anglican church in the Parish of Little Venice, London, and forms part of Paddington Green conservation area. Today it stands at the junction of Edgware Road and Harrow Road, overlooking the East end of Westway and the approaches to Marylebone Flyover, so seen by tens of thousands of motorists daily.

History
The present building is the third church on the site, once forming a centrepiece of the ancient villages of Paddington and Lilestone. John Donne preached his first sermon in the original church and William Hogarth was married in the second.

 The current Georgian church was commissioned in 1788 and consecrated in 1791. Designed by John Plaw with a Greek Cross ground plan, in yellow London stock brick dressed with white stone. It is one of two confirmed surviving buildings by Plaw in the UK, along with Belle Isle on Windermere. A further building in Romford, known as The Round House, has been attributed to him. John Plaw later worked in Southampton before emigrating to Canada, where he designed several public and private buildings.

The church was altered in the 19th century but was restored to its mid-Georgian appearance by architect Raymond Erith in the early 1970s using some of the compensation for the construction of the urban motorway Westway, alongside the church. Restoration included the chancel being reinstated in its original form, the nave reseated with box pews and the organ moved to the West end. The organ case is dedicated as a memorial to Erith. The church houses monuments to some of the area's residents, including sculptor Joseph Nollekens and lexicographer Peter Mark Roget.

St Mary’s Churchyard
The adjoining churchyard was converted to a public park in the 1890s and is now known as St Mary's Gardens. It consists of grass with scattered trees. The grave of well-known 18th-century actress Sarah Siddons is located towards the northern end. Some headstones from the former churchyard are stacked against the west wall of the Gardens.

The southern part of the churchyard was destroyed to make way for the approaches to Marylebone Flyover in the 1960s, with exhumed burials being reinterred in an area of Mill Hill cemetery and marked with a plaque.

Notable burials

Remaining Churchyard
Rev Dawson Burns (1828–1909), temperance leader
William Chandless (1829–1896), Amazon explorer
Rev Alexander Geddes (1737–1802), Biblical scholar
Arthur Roberts (1852–1933), comedian
Basil Owen Woodd (1760–1831), hymn writer (erected by the Crosse baronets)
Leonard Charles Wyon (1826–1891), engraver and coin-designer
Sir Stephen Spender (1909–1995), poet

St Mary's Gardens
Thomas Banks (1735–1805), sculptor
Thomas Blore (1754–1818), historian
William Collins RA (1788–1847), artist
Matthew Dubourg (1703–1767), violinist
Benjamin Haydon, (1786–1846) painter
Joseph Nollekens (1737–1823), sculptor, and his father, Joseph Francis Nollekens, artist
Emma Paterson (1846–1886), feminist and unionist
Thomas Richmond (1771–1837), miniaturist
Sarah Siddons (1755–1831), actress
Charles Stedman (1753–1812), army officer

References

External links
Biographical information about John Plaw from Historic Places, Prince Edward Island, Canada
Guide and map from City of Westminster
Parish of Little Venice website

Churches completed in 1791
18th-century Church of England church buildings
Church of England church buildings in the City of Westminster
Diocese of London